Al-Shara'i is a sub-district located in Jiblah District, Ibb Governorate, Yemen. Al-Shara'i had a population of 7,616 according to the 2004 census.

References 

Sub-districts in Jiblah District